Yulha-dong is a dong in Dong-gu, Daegu, South Korea.  Its name literally means "beneath the chestnut tree."  It lies just north of the Geumho River.  Yulha-dong is the legal dong; its boundaries coincide with the administrative entity Ansim 1-dong.

Singi Station and Yulha Station on Daegu Subway Line 1 are located in Yulha-dong.  A shrine to Seven Year War hero Choe Eum-yeong is also located here.

See also
Geography of South Korea
Subdivisions of South Korea

Dong District, Daegu
Neighbourhoods in South Korea